Sarah Clark (born 3 January 1978) is a British judoka, who has competed at three Olympic Games.

Judo career
Clark came to prominence when winning the Scottish Championships in 1997. In 2000 and 2001 she won back to back half-middleweight British titles at the British Judo Championships.

In 2004, she was selected to represent Great Britain at the 2004 Summer Olympics in Greece, she competed in the half-middleweight (-63 kg) category and reached the last 16, where she was beaten by the eventual silver medalist, Claudia Heill. She then lost to Ronda Rousey in the first round of the repechage. Also during 2004 she won a bronze medal at the 2004 European Judo Championships, in Bucharest.

Two more British titles were secured in 2005 and 2006 and she achieved her best result to date, which was a European gold medal at the 2006 European Judo Championships, in Tampere.

In 2008, she went to her second Olympic Games, at the 2008 Summer Olympics, she again lost to Heill, this time in the first round of the women's 63 kg. The following year in 2009, a silver medal at the 2009 European Judo Championships took her tally to a European medal of every colour. From 2008 to 2012 she secured three more British titles, bringing her total to seven.

Clark ended her Olympic career on a high note by gaining selection for her home Olympic Games in London. Dropping down a weightclass, she competed in the women's 57 kg category, where she lost in the first round to Automne Pavia.

In 2014, she won the gold medal in the 63kg for Scotland at the 2014 Commonwealth Games in Glasgow.

References

External links
 
 
 
 

1978 births
Living people
English female judoka
Olympic judoka of Great Britain
Judoka at the 2004 Summer Olympics
Judoka at the 2008 Summer Olympics
Judoka at the 2012 Summer Olympics
Sportspeople from Durham, England
Commonwealth Games medallists in judo
Commonwealth Games gold medallists for Scotland
Commonwealth Games silver medallists for Scotland
Judoka at the 2002 Commonwealth Games
Judoka at the 2014 Commonwealth Games
Medallists at the 2002 Commonwealth Games
Medallists at the 2014 Commonwealth Games